is a former Japanese football player. Shoichiro Sakamoto is his brother.

Club statistics

References

External links

j-league

1991 births
Living people
Association football people from Nara Prefecture
Japanese footballers
J2 League players
FC Gifu players
FC Kariya players
FC Osaka players
Association football defenders